Almagate (trade name Almax) is an aluminium- and magnesium-containing antacid. It was first described in 1984.

Adverse effects 
Almagate is well tolerated. In a clinical trial, the most common adverse effects were diarrhea and nausea.

References 

Antacids
Aluminium compounds
Magnesium compounds